The Circuito Sur de Oriente (CSO), meaning "Southern Circuit of the Orient", is a west-east highway connecting Bayamo to Santiago de Cuba, through Manzanillo, Niquero and the southern coastal side of eastern Cuba, below the Sierra Maestra mountain range. Also known as Circuito Guacanayabo-Sur de Oriente, because it crosses the Gulf of Guacanayabo, the name Oriente (meaning "Orient"), refers to the ancient and former Oriente Province. With a length of 347 km, it is the fourth-longest Cuban highway after the "Carretera Central", the "Circuito Norte" and the "Circuito Sur".

Route

Description
The CSO, whose endpoints cross the Carretera Central, starts in Bayamo, capital of Granma Province, and ends in Santiago, the second Cuban city and capital of Santiago de Cuba Province. It is divided into a pair of Carretera branches:
The 6-4, also known as "Carretera a Manzanillo", "Carretera a Campechuela" and "Carretera a Niquero", runs From Bayamo to a fork to Niquero via Yara, Manzanillo, Campechuela and Media Luna. It crosses the shore of the Gulf of Guacanayabo, and the section to Niquero centre continues to Cape Cruz, through Playa Las Coloradas, in Desembarco del Granma National Park.
The 6-20, also known as "Carretera de Pilón" and "Carretera Granma", runs from the fork to Niquero to Santiago de Cuba, through Pilón, Marea del Portillo, Uvero and Chivirico (seat of Guamá municipality). It runs at almost along the coastline, below the Sierra Maestra mountain range and the Turquino National Park.

Table
The table below shows the route of the Circuito Sur de Oriente. Note: Provincial seats are shown in bold; the names shown under brackets in the section "Municipality" indicate the municipal seats.

See also

Roads in Cuba
Circuito Sur

References

External links

Roads in Cuba
Granma Province
Santiago de Cuba Province